The Ellen Frank Illumination Arts Foundation's Cities of Peace exhibition displays areas of the world that have been wrought with conflict.
Her website reads: “Frank’s visit to Jerusalem in 1999 inspired her to produce the first painting in the series and to visualize the creation of other works representing additional cities that have survived strife. The series directs action through hopeful energy by celebrating the best of the human spirit, transforming anguish into beauty.”  Under the artistic direction of Ellen Frank, the project was produced by interns of many different origins at the Illumination Atelier of Ellen Frank Illumination Arts Foundation.

The exhibition premiered in the Laurie M. Tisch Gallery of the JCC Manhattan 2005-2006, but the most recent exhibition took place on January 7, 2009 in the Cathedral of St. John the Divine in New York City. As of now, the cities included in the project are Baghdad, Kabul, Jerusalem, Beijing, Hiroshima, New York City and Lhasa. The project continues, with pieces devoted to other cities such as Hanoi, Seoul and Warsaw. Each painting of the series includes a gold leaf; Frank explains that this leaf symbolizes the necessity of understanding as a prerequisite for peace. In addition, a crimson leaf, meant to represent the color of human blood, is tucked into each piece in honor of the dead. According to Frank, each country's unique artistic traditions are incorporated in the respective paintings; these include illuminated manuscripts, embroidery, architectural mosaics, icons, tapestries, woodcarvings and metalwork, and micrography.

Jerusalem: A Painting Toward Peace 
This work was inspired by the scenic view upon approaching Jerusalem, the Golden City: “the cab rounding a corner, the first glimpse of the old city wall, and the city itself hovering behind King David’s Gate.”   The piece is based on early pictures of the hill upon which Jerusalem sits, and encapsulates the city itself, including important sites: the Golden Gate, the wall and the Dome of the Rock.  The border pattern combines a historical Islamic floral motif with the Star of David; this unification of the two symbols represents peace. There are hundreds of small figures represent everyone – those directly affected by events in the region and those who hope for peace there.
[(Israel) 4 types of 22-karat gold leaf, mica, egg  tempera on Belgian linen  (69 x 104 in.) 2004]

Sarajevo: Here 
According to the foundation, the piece is meant to depict the ethnic and religious diversity of the city. The cultural heritage of the city is meant to be portrayed by imagined pages of illuminated manuscripts. Within the gold borders of these pages, the city is meant to be represented by its characteristic red-tile-roofed buildings such as mosques, minarets and spires. In addition, the city's languages and unique symbols are documented. The churches, mosques and synagogues of Sarajevo often stood side-by-side, symbolizing what Frank describes as the city's important trait: benefaction. In response to the culturacide in Sarajevo–the single largest intentional book burning and the longest military siege in modern history–this piece is meant to honor the people of Sarajevo, their spirit and their art.
[(Bosnia-Herzegovina)  22 k gold leaf, palladium, moon, and copper leaf, with egg tempera on Belgian linen.   (69 X 104 in.) 2007]

Monrovia: In Constellation 
Frank explains: “Monrovia: In Constellation affirms the initial values and hopes of the great cultural experiment that was Liberia’s creation. Aligning diverse ethnicities and cultural practices as star patterns within the organized mystery of night, Monrovia: In Constellation celebrates the achievements that characterize the uniqueness of Monrovia.”
[(Liberia)  Palladium and moon gold, watercolor on Belgian linen (69 X 104 in.) 2007]

Hiroshima: Winter Bloom 
Frank explains that the five emperors of Hiroshima are represented either by portrait or a distinctive flag. Her website also describes the large-scale figures, tucked behind the leaves in the painting, facing in different directions and even dancing. She writes: “In this work, the symbolic winter-blooming plum blossom cascades across the once-secret ‘Pre-Attack Mosaic’ photograph of Hiroshima taken by U.S. military aerial reconnaissance in April 1945.” 
[(Japan) 22-karat moon gold, 12-karat white gold, egg tempera on Belgian linen (69 x 104 in.) 2005 Leaf, gift of Richard Swaim]

Lhasa: 10 Directions
The border pattern, which is two gold-leaf pillars, is said to be inspired by the Jokhang monastery’s columns. In addition, the border pattern of the painting is described as using motifs from mudras. Micrography is used in this piece as well; the foundation’s website explains that an anonymous sixth-century poet’s words cascade across the skyline of the piece.
[(Tibet) 22-karat gold leaf, egg tempera  on Belgian linen (69 x 104 in.) 2005]

Baghdad: City of Peace, Truly
The foundation explains that this piece is inspired by Baghdad’s history: “the painting features layers of the map that chase more than five thousand years of splendid, then destroyed grandeur of what was once the greatest city on earth.”  Frank's website goes on to say that this work includes two large-scale figures bowing in deference to the people of Iraq as well as traditional cuneiform, an aerial photo of 1925 Baghdad and its border pattern is said to be inspired by Al-Kadhimain Mosque. Apparently Baghdad is in the painting's center and is meant to enclose mirrored muqarnas, which are meant to reference the medieval Zumurrud Khatan tomb.
[(Iraq) 22-karat gold leaf, 23-karat red gold, palladium leaf, mica, egg tempera on Belgian linen (69 x 104 in.) 2005 Leaf, gift of an anonymous donor]

New York: This is My City!

Apparently the viewer's perspective is from Midtown looking east. According to Frank, “On the three sides of the painting’s border are references to the more than forty-five buildings from Thirty-fourth to Fifty-ninth Street that are all taller than six hundred feet.” 
[(USA) 22-karat gold leaf, palladium leaf,  egg tempera on Belgian linen (104 x 69 in.) 2005]

Kabul: I Love Her (for knowledge and love both come from her dust)

The artistic director explains that this piece was inspired by a panoramic photo of Kabul between 1870 and 1882 and that gold-leaf micrography was utilized. In this case, the verses are said to be walking on a road as marching words of love, not as an army. Meant to act as a traditional Afghan tribal carpet, traditional symbols that were once banned, such as dance and books, are said to be woven into the piece. In addition, figures and mountains stand above the city, a design that is said to represent prayer for the healing of Kabul's people.
[(Afghanistan) 22-karat gold leaf, moon gold, egg tempera on Belgian linen (104 x 69 in.) 2005]

Beijing: Heavenly Peace, on Earth! 
According to the foundation, “This painting celebrates Beijing as a sacred city, marking the proportions of its city plan (the map of old Beijing), star pattern (the Purple Protected Enclosure), and geographic site (the Luoshu and Hetu diagrams). Through the large-scale figures, the work honors Beijing in dance (referencing the tomb painting The Dancing Girl in Red), in costume (inspired by the handscroll Court Ladies Wearing Flowered Head Dresses), and in cityscape (based on the scroll The Splendor of an Imperial Capital).”   Frank's website goes on to explain that the city is set in the painting's center, a fact that is meant to highlight the idea that the Forbidden City is where the earth and Heavens touch. In this piece, Beijing therefore represents the best of both worlds: it is both ancient and modern, situated between earth and Heaven.
[(China) 22-karat gold leaf, 23-karat red gold, 12-karat white gold, 22-karat moon gold, mica and bronze powders, egg tempera on Belgian linen (104 x 69 in.) 2005]

References
EllenFrank.com Cities of Peace PDF
EllenFrank.com Cities of Peace page
EllenFrank.com Exhibitions page
NYT Article
NY1 Report

Notes

Art exhibitions in the United States